Stauranderaster is an extinct genus of sea stars that lived from the Late Jurassic to the Paleocene. Its fossils have been found in Europe.

Sources

 Fossils (Smithsonian Handbooks) by David Ward (Page 188)

External links
Stauranderaster in the Paleobiology Database

Valvatida
Jurassic echinoderms
Cretaceous echinoderms
Paleocene echinoderms
Prehistoric echinoderms of Europe
Late Jurassic first appearances
Paleocene genus extinctions
Prehistoric starfish genera